Time Out Youth is a nonprofit organization in Charlotte, North Carolina, that advocates, supports and provides emergency shelter services for LGBT youth. 

Time Out Youth was founded by Tonda Taylor in 1991 as a way to help LGBT youth who had been banished from their own homes because of their sexuality. In its first years it hosted Charlotte's first LGBT prom, and was part of the national initiatives for LGBT youth.

Today they offer group counseling and education to 11-20 year olds who identify as lesbian, gay, bisexual or transgender. They also have a host home program where LGBT youth 18-23 are temporarily placed with host families or individuals until they can find a permanent home. LGBT youth account for nearly 40 percent of homeless youth and are at a high risk for assault and violence, hence the need for an organization like Time Out Youth. The organization serves a seven-county region in the Charlotte metro area.

References

External link
 Time Out Youth Records, J Murrey Atkins Library, UNC Charlotte
 Time Out Youth Official webside

LGBT youth organizations based in the United States
Organizations based in Charlotte, North Carolina
Nonprofit youth organizations based in the United States